The Slayers light novel series features a cast of characters created by Hajime Kanzaka and illustrated by Rui Araizumi. It follows the adventures of teenage sorceress Lina Inverse and her companions as they journey through their world. Using powerful magic and swordsmanship, they battle difficult overreaching wizards, demons seeking to destroy the world, dark lords, and the occasional hapless gang of bandits. Slayers has been adapted into several manga series, five televised anime series, two three-episode original video animations, and five anime films where events and characters differ significantly from the original novels.

Major characters

Lina Inverse

 is the main protagonist and central figure of the Slayers franchise. Although still a teenager, she is a powerful and well-known sorceress with nicknames such as the "Bandit Killer" and "Black Witch". Born to a merchant family, she has a great love of money, treasure, and food.

Lina specializes in black magic, specifically attack magic that calls upon the power of demons. Her signature spell, Dragon Slave, comes from the power of the Dark Lord Shabranigdu, while the Ragna Blade and her most powerful spell the Giga Slave call upon the Lord of Nightmares. She is also a skilled swordsman, though not on the level of Gourry or Zelgadis, as she lacks physical strength. During the series, Lina and company face down and defeat many powerful demons, including a fragment of Shabranigdu, Hellmaster Fibrizo, and Darkstar.

Gourry has been Lina's constant companion since the opening of the series, and never leaves her for very long. Lina once risks the destruction of the world by casting the unpredictable Giga Slave in order to save Gourry's life. Although the two appear to be in love with each other, there is no romance between them.

Gourry Gabriev

 is a wandering swordsman who meets Lina at the beginning of the series and accompanies her from then on as a self-appointed bodyguard. Although chivalrous and a loyal friend, he is rather dumb and appears to have memory deficiencies. However, his skills as a swordsman are unmatched, especially when armed with his family's magic blade, the Sword of Light, also known as Gorun Nova. He also has a high magic capacity and the potential to cast spells that rival Lina's power, but because of his faulty memory and disinterest, he cannot remember spells well enough to ever use them.

Gourry eventually falls in love with Lina, which he expresses through his promise that he will guard her for the rest of his life. He is not as shy about his feelings as Lina is, and unlike her he will not violently deny it when asked. He does not act on them, though, and he seems content with merely watching out for Lina's well-being.

Zelgadis Graywords

 is a sorcerer who Lina and Gourry befriend during their first big adventure. As a retainer for his relative Rezo the Red Priest, Zelgadis and his colleagues fight Lina for the philosopher's stone. However, he is actually seeking the stone to make himself powerful enough to kill Rezo as revenge for turning him into a chimera. Although he asked Rezo to make him stronger, he did not know he would do so by fusing him with a rock golem and brow daemon. Zelgadis teams up with Lina and Gourry to destroy Rezo, and again two months later to defeat his copy when bounties are issued for the three. Sometime later, he runs into and works with them, plus Amelia, while attempting to acquire the manuscript of the Claire Bible in possession of the demon-worshiping cult, with the hope it will help him turn back into human.

Zelgadis specializes in Shamanistic magic, which includes both elemental and astral magic, the latter of which deals with the astral, or spiritual, plane. Since he is part brow daemon, he is unable to cast black magic, as doing so would require him to call upon the power of another demonic being——which, in the Slayers universe, is akin to willing oneself out of existence. Though he is not as learned in the art as Lina, Zelgadis' even combination of physical force and magical finesse render him among the most fearsome warriors.

Zelgadis is an enigma to his comrades, due to his quiet and asocial nature. Despite traveling with Lina and her friends, he considers himself separate from them and even a little bit evil, as "the heartless mystical swordsman" of the group. When he was a teenager, Rezo transformed him into a three-part chimera. He travels with the Slayers to find a spell that can change him back into a human. Despite the incredible abilities bestowed upon him by the transformation, he dislikes his appearance; his skin is stone hard, tinged blue-grey with pebbles scattered across its surface, and his silver hair is as stiff as steel wire. In Slayers Evolution-R, Rezo informs Zelgadis that he knows of no cure to return him to human, but Hajime Kanzaka has stated in interviews that Zelgadis would probably eventually find his cure.

Sylphiel 

 is a shrine maiden and the daughter of the high priest of Sairaag. She knows Gourry from when he helped her father in a previous visit to the city, and seemingly has had a crush on him ever since. She is introduced in the third novel. By the time Sylphiel realizes that Rezo the Red Priest is somehow poisoning her father, he already has control over the people of Sairaag. She teams up with Zelgadis and, shortly after, with Lina, Gourry and Lantz. In the fight with Copy Rezo, Sylphiel's father and all of Sairaag are wiped off the planet.

Sylphiel is weak in shamanism and black magic. However, as a cleric, her skills in white magic (healing and protection) are impressive. Her defensive magic is powerful enough to easily hold its own against both Copy Rezo. With her healing magic she is able to bring Lina back from the brink of death using a high level resurrection spell.

In the anime, Sylphiel joins the Slayers for the end of the first series, and again near the end of the second series NEXT. She reappears in Slayers Revolution during the attack on Seiruun.

Amelia  

 is the youngest princess of the Holy Kingdom of Saillune, and its head shrine maiden. She is introduced in the fourth novel, where she joins Lina and Gourry on their travels after they stop her uncle and nephew's assassination attempts on her father, Phil Saillune. Amelia longs to be a "hero of justice" and quixotically pursues her quest for justice by following Lina and fighting those who appear to be villains. Her naïve tendency to believe whatever she is told sometimes leads her to mistake friend and foe. Although Amelia is around the same age as Lina, the latter is often annoyed with Amelia for her naïveté, desire to learn Dragon Slave, and her larger bust size, but eventually comes to accept her as a friend. Amelia becomes close friends with everyone in the group, but it is clear that she starts to develop romantic feelings for Zelgadis. Their first meeting was not a very good one, but they become quite close as they tend to be paired during missions. Amelia teases him playing chess, or angrily beats him over his maltreatment of innocent forest animals, and gets away without so much as an angry glare.

Amelia's perspective on good and evil evolves significantly as the series progresses. Most of her lessons in justice and heroism came from her father. After the murder of her mother, Amelia vowed never to use blades, though she once used the Sword of Light to channel the Ra-Tilt. Amelia is versed in the common clerical spells, and knows a bit of black and Shamanistic magic that she learned with her older sister. Her older sister, Gracia, is Naga the Serpent.

Xellos

, known as Xellos the Priest, is a high-level demon who serves Greater Beast Zellas Metallium. He serves as her emissary and is extremely powerful; in the Incarnation War over 1,000 years ago, Xellos destroyed nearly all dragons by himself. Whereas Shabranigdu's four other demon lieutenants created both a priest and general to do their bidding, Zellas only created Xellos, thus he is twice as strong as the other demons' emissaries. Xellos is sometimes a hindrance, and sometimes a help to Lina and the other main characters. His actions appear frustratingly inconsistent because of his oft-changing loyalties at his master's request. His signature response to any important question that he does not want to answer is, "That is a secret!" (Sore wa himitsu desu!).

Xellos first appears in the fifth novel, where he is a mysterious priest that teams up with Lina and her friends so he can destroy the manuscript of the Claire Bible in possession of the demon-worshiping cult. In the next novel, Xellos reappears and starts to travel with Lina and company. He later admits to Lina that he is a demon serving Zellas and that he was originally tasked with destroying the Claire Bible manuscripts, but his current job was concocted by Hellmaster Fibrizo and is to protect and guide Lina to the Claire Bible. Knowing she can not defeat the strong demon, Lina accepts Xellos into the group. After successfully leading Lina to the Claire Bible at Dragons' Peak, Xellos flees after being severely injured by Gaav.

Naga the Serpent

, or Naga the White Serpent, is a powerful sorceress with an unstable but resilient personality. She does not appear in the main Slayers novels, but instead is a main character in the Slayers Special and Slayers Smash spin-off prequel novels. She is obsessed with Lina, and follows the younger sorceress around for some time, annoying Lina with her characteristic cackling laugh.

Naga's main spells, such as Freeze Arrow, are water- and ice-based, in direct opposition to Lina's fire-based skills. She has also shown the ability to use powerful shamanistic, white magic, and necromancy spells. Her true name is Gracia Ul Naga Saillune; she is the daughter of Prince Phil and Amelia's older sister. Naga left home after her mother was murdered.

Naga appears in the OVAs and films, and makes a cameo appearance in Slayers Evolution-R as "Nama", a sentient suit of armor who remembers very little about her life before her soul was placed in the living armor. Her identity is never confirmed, but Nama's familiar laugh gives Lina chills.

Martina

 is an anime-original character who appears exclusively in Slayers Next. She is the princess of the kingdom of Zoana and has green hair styled in drills. She specializes in curses through the power of Lord Zoamelgustar, a fictional monster that she worships; surprisingly, her curses actually work, even though Zoamelgustar does not exist. At the beginning of the series, she and her father plot to capture Amelia, but Lina saves Amelia and then casts a Dragon Slave to destroy Martina's castle, She then runs off and learns magic so that she can take revenge. She later joins Lina and the gang on their adventures. When Hellmaster Fibrizo kills her during the final battle, Martina uses her last moments to encourage Lina to keep fighting and save Gourry. Martina is fickle in her love affairs, obsessed with whatever man she happens to see first on any given day. At first she is hung up on Zelgadis, but her interests switch to Gourry and even Xellos as the series progresses, before settling on Zangulus. She eventually marries Zangulus. Lina and the gang remark that Martina is the comic relief character in their party.

Filia

 is an anime-original character who appears exclusively in Slayers TRY. She is a priestess of the Fire Dragon King. As a Golden Dragon, she has a pronounced sense of honor and is dedicated to "fulfilling her duties to the temple". Any monster that crosses her path annoys her, and she doesn't get along with Xellos at all. She carries a large mace (affectionately dubbed "Mace-sama") in her garter, and uses it to end most of her arguments.

Filia's Golden Dragon magic from the outer world is a raw, more intense form of white magic. Amelia states that the white magic used by clerics is only an "empty shell" of Filia's ancient holy magic. Filia's skills include clairvoyance, healing, purification, transportation, and offensive spells effective against the most powerful monster. Her spell Chaotic Disintegrate is an astral offensive spell that outclasses the Ra-Tilt. Filia is able to switch back and forth with ease between her dragon and human forms. Her dragon's form comically wears a pink bow on the end of her tail. While in dragon form, Filia can fly, surpassing the speed of a normal Ray Wing levitation spell. Her Laser Breath, which fires an incredibly destructive beam from a dragon's mouth, can be used in both human and dragon forms.

Filia originally wanted Lina's big sister Luna to accompany her on her quest, but Luna refuses and suggests Lina as a replacement. At the end of Slayers TRY, Filia accepts the egg of the reborn Valgaav in repentance for what her ancestors did to his kind, and raises him as his adoptive mother.

Pokota

, full name , is an anime-original character created for Slayers Revolution and Slayers Evolution-R, though he borrows certain elements from the character Luke seen in the novels. He resembles a small stuffed animal rabbit with large ears that double as a set of functional arms used for casting spells, wielding swords, or gliding through the air. Like Lina, he is a powerful sorcerer capable of casting various spells, including the Dragon Slave. He wields a replica of the Sword of Light, which he carries in a pocket in his chest.

Pokota was born a human, the prince of Taforashia. When he was a teenager, the Durum sickness swept through Taforashia, and the king became very ill. Rezo the Red Priest appeared and sealed the residents of Taforashia in sleeping chambers to isolate them until a cure was found. In this way he sealed Pokota's human body, but he used the magical Hellmaster's Jar to transfer Pokota's spirit into his current form. Years later, Pokota is searching for Rezo in order to find a way to revive his people.

Antagonists

Rezo the Red Priest

 is the main antagonist of the first novel. He is a world-famous cleric and healer who travels the world performing miracles. Considered one of the "Five Great Sages", he has mastered not only clerical white magic, but shamanistic and black magic as well. Rezo is over a century old, but does not look his age; as Lina describes him as looking "both young and old" at the same time. He was born blind and is always clad in red. Rezo is the only-known relative of Zelgadis, who assumes he is either his grandfather or great-grandfather.

Although he travels the land healing the sick and blind, Rezo is unable to cure his own blindness. So he seeks the philosopher's stone hoping it will boost his power enough to accomplish his wish to actually see the world. However, upon attaining and swallowing the philosopher's stone, Rezo is revealed to have been taken over by the Dark Lord Shabranigdu from inside. Lina is able to defeat the Dark Lord using the incomplete Giga Slave and the Sword of Light, with help from Rezo's soul, but the priest dies in the process.

In the anime, it is later revealed that Rezo survived by transferring his soul, as well as the ghost of Shabranigdu, into the Hellmaster's Jar. Pokota resurrects Rezo in order to revive the people of Taforashia from their suspended state. After reviving the people of Taforashia, Rezo wants to see again, if only for a moment, so he opens his eyes. As the power of Shabranigdu returns to him, he asks Lina to destroy him once more. With the help of the completed Giga Slave, Lina destroys Rezo, and the ghost of Shabranigdu with him.

Halciform the White
 is the main antagonist of the second novel. He is a sorcerer and chairman of Atlas City's sorcerers' council. Missing for six months by the time Lina and Gourry arrive in the city, a succession battle between vice chairmen Talim the Purple and Daymia the Blue is occurring. Lina and Gourry find Halciform sealed away in Daymia's house and free him. Unknown to them, Halciform was kidnapping and experimenting on townspeople to obtain immortality. Because he has obtained quasi-immortality by making a contract with Seigram and sealing his soul in a pledge stone, Talim recruited Daymia to seal Halciform away. Now freed, Halciform has Seigram curse Daymia and kills Talim. Lina and Gourry succeed in breaking Halciform's pledge stone and force Seigram to flee. Halciform, who also extended his life by consuming the demon Gio Gaia, is finally killed when Rubia, the homunculus he created of the dead woman he loves, uses the Sword of Light on him.

Seigram

, known as Seigram the Faceless, is a masked demon working for Halciform in the second novel. He confronts Lina and Gourry several times, including leading enemies to fight them, but never engages in battle himself. This is revealed to be due to Halciform making a contract with him, which required Halciform to seal his own soul in a pledge stone that the demon wears as his mask. The risk of the mask breaking and the fact that Halciform will die if Seigram does, is why Halciform has the demon refrain from battle. After Lina and Gourry succeed in breaking the pledge stone and seriously injuring Seigram, the demon flees. He returns in the sixth novel seeking revenge on Lina and Gourry. Still weak from his injuries, Seigram fused with the human Zuma, who also has a grudge on Lina. Seigram/Zuma is killed by Lina's Ragna Blade.

In Slayers NEXT, Seigram is a servant of Gaav the Demon Dragon King and seemingly as powerful as his rival Xellos. He first appears as a mysterious figure that frames Damia and Tarimu by summoning ooze monsters out of their estates, and he makes an alliance with Halcyform. He later attacks Lina in the temple of the Claire Bible manuscript, revealing that he was granted enough of Gaav's power to withstand a Dragon Slave. He is killed when Xellos holds him directly in the path of Lina's Ragna Blade.

Eris

Eris is a young woman in the third novel who first appears as a novice bounty hunter chasing Zelgadis in Sairaag after Rezo the Red Priest put a bounty on him. Due to her lack of strength, the heroes agree to bring her along with them for her safety. However, Lina eventually deduces that Eris is the real Vrumugun; a sorcerer who confronted the heroes several times previously, despite easily being killed each time. These Vrumuguns were copies she created and controlled. With her full name , she was Rezo's assistant, helping him perform experiments to cure his blindness. Having been in love with Rezo, Eris wants revenge and to make a name for herself, so she has been controlling the homunculus copy that Rezo made of himself and placed very large bounties for the capture of Lina, Gourry and Zelgadis. However, when the copy reveals itself to be self-aware, it kills Eris in revenge for experimenting on it alongside Rezo.

In the anime, Vrumugun is partnered with Zangulus, and they try to capture Lina and Gourry. However, while Zangulus is short-tempered and arrogant, Vrumugun is quiet, collected, and takes everything seriously. Eris is killed in cold blood by Copy Rezo after he merges with the ancient Demon Beast Zanaffar that was buried in the Holy Tree Flagoon.

Copy Rezo

 is the main antagonist of the third novel. He is a homunculus copy of Rezo the Red Priest, created by the original Rezo as a lab rat for experiments to cure his blindness. Although Copy Rezo's sight is cured, the real Rezo is unable to make it work on himself, leading to even more experiments on the copy. It was after being fused with a demon, that Copy Rezo gained self-awareness, causing it to seek revenge on the original Rezo. But with the real Rezo dead, the copy must settle for proving his superiority by killing those who did. It pretended to allow Eris to control it in taking over Sairaag and placing the bounties on Lina, Gourry and Zelgadis. Copy Rezo is finally killed when Lina pins him to the Flagoon tree with the Bless Blade, and the tree feeds off his evil energy.

In the anime, Copy Rezo orders Eris to lure the three of them to Sairaag, where he attempts to defeat them by resurrecting and absorbing the power of the demon beast Zanaffar. However, Lina, Gourry, and Zelgadis, accompanied by Amelia and Sylphiel, kill him using the Blessed Blade and the power of the tree Flaggoon.

Kanzel
 is an antagonist in the fourth novel. He first appears to be a strong sorcerer working with Chris Saillune to assassinate his brother Phil. He is handsome, but has a scar on his right cheek and an icy stare. However, every time Kanzel attacks, he seems to be focused on killing Lina instead. Kanzel's actual partner, Alfred, eventually breaks ties with him because of his repeated deviations from their plan. Kanzel reveals himself to be a mid-ranked demon who teamed up with the Saillunes just so he could come into contact with Lina, whom he was ordered to kill with minimal human casualties; later revealed in the series to have been the orders of Gaav. Kanzel is killed by Gourry's Sword of Light that was enhanced with Dragon Slave by Lina, and with help from Amelia.

Zuma

 is a magic-wielding assassin who first appears in the fourth novel when he is hired by Kanzel to kill Lina. He has a reputation as the best in his line of work, with Lina being the only person to ever survive one of his attacks. Zuma continues to make attempts on Lina's life out of honor. Gourry uses the Sword of Light to cut off Zuma's right arm, while Lina turns his left hand to ash with a spell. Zuma returns in the sixth novel, still seeking to fulfill the contract to kill Lina and a new contract on the merchant , who hires Lina to protect him. Zuma has now fused with the demon Seigram, this being why he has both arms again; later revealed in the series to have been done by Raltark. Zuma is also revealed to be the alter ego of Laddock. Zuma/Laddock/Seigram is killed by Lina's Ragna Blade, when his human heart causes him to hesitate after meeting eyes with his son.

In Slayers Evolution-R, Lina once killed a group of bandits that were responsible for killing Zuma's wife, thus denying him vengeance. He has his hands slashed off a second time before Xellos appears and kills him in order to steal the Hellmaster's Jar.

Demon-worshiping cult
An unnamed  is the antagonist group of the fifth novel. Based near the village of Mayin, they worship Shabranigdu and his five lieutenants; Chaos Dragon, Deep Sea, Dynast, Greater Beast, and Hellmaster Fribrizo. Using a manuscript of the Claire Bible, they resurrect , the beast who destroyed Sairaag 120 years ago, with the goal of attacking Saillune, but are stopped by the main characters. When they are killed by Zelgadis, it is revealed that Gilfa's brain and mouth were transplanted into Vedul's hump. Battle axe-wielding , whom Lina speculates is a fusion between human and white tiger, wears an incomplete Zanaffar as anti-magic armor, but is killed by Gourry's Sword of Light. But it is another cultist who is consumed by a living Zanaffar armor for it to achieve its complete form; a silver, dragon-sized, wolf-like beast with whip-like tentacles. Lina kills Zanaffar by using her new spell Ragna Blade, which summons and channels darkness into a blade, to create a hole in its body that she then casts Fireball into.

Gaav

 is one of the five demon lieutenants created by Shabranigdu who first appears in the seventh novel. During the Incarnation War over 1,000 years ago, he fought Aqualord alongside Shabranigdu, but "died" striking the final blow. Although demons do not "die", their power is temporarily sealed and will recoup over time, Aqualord placed an imperfect seal on Gaav that caused him to be reincarnated into a human body. After countless reincarnations, Gaav has regained his memories and power, but his spirit has merged with his human host's. This causes him to oppose Shabranigdu and the other lieutenants; if Shabranigdu is revived, the human-bodied Gaav will be destroyed along with the rest of the world.

Despite not knowing the details of Hellmaster's plan involving Lina, Gaav orders his subordinates to kill Lina; including Kanzel and Raltark, the latter of whom first appears in the sixth novel as Laddock Lanzard's butler. Under Gaav's orders, Rashart becomes the head of the royal guard in the Kingdom of Dils and is tasked with forging an alliance with the dragons and elves, but the plan is foiled by Xellos. On Dragons' Peak, Raltark is killed by Xellos and Lina, which sees Rashart fetch Gaav. After seriously wounding Xellos, causing him to flee, Gaav fights Lina and company.

Hellmaster Fibrizo

 is the oldest and the most powerful of the five demon lieutenants created by Shabranigdu. It was Fibrizo who ignited the Incarnation War over 1,000 years ago when he awakened the part of Shabranigdu sealed within the sorcerer Lei Magnus. During the war, Shabranigdu posted Hellmaster to the Desert of Destruction as part of the seal to destroy Aqualord. According to Xellos, most of Hellmaster's servants were destroyed in the war, this being why Xellos is tasked with carrying out his plan of protecting and escorting Lina to the Claire Bible. Hellmaster is most likely the second-in-command of the demon race, and like all demons, he seeks to destroy the world and return everything to chaos. He manifests as an androgynous little boy in order to trick his victims into underestimating him.

Fibrizo has complete control over death and the souls of the departed. He is able to raise thousands of people from the grave as living dead under his control with their memories and personality intact. He can also encase people in a life-absorbing green crystal, or kill anyone simply by breaking a golden marble that represents their lives. Intelligent and cunning; he knows how to manipulate people, and convincingly pretends to be an ordinary child. His eagerness to destroy the world goes far beyond any other monster's. Though cruel and sadistic, his personality fits his childish appearance, as he enjoys making fun of his victims and using people like toys to entertain himself.

He is probably the one who decided to create the Monster Barrier, which isolated the battlefields to the outer and inner worlds, weakening the dragons' forces. In Slayers NEXT, Fibrizo plans to force Lina to draw upon the power of the Lord of Nightmares and use the Giga Slave, which can destroy the entire world. He uses Gaav and Xellos to lead Lina to the discovery of the Giga Slave spell, then joins Lina as a young pickpocket to watch what happens. When Lina, fearing the power of the Giga Slave, brings down Gaav with the weaker Ragna Blade spell instead, Fibrizo destroys Gaav and kidnaps Gourry, forcing her to cast the Giga Slave. However, the Giga Slave summons the Lord of Nightmares herself in Lina's body, who obliterates him, giving him the destruction he craved.

Valgaav

Valgaav is one of the main adversaries in the Slayers TRY anime. Once known as Prince Val of the Ancient Dragon clan, he is nearly killed by the Golden Dragons, who feared the dark powers of the Ancient Dragons and exterminated them. He is saved at the last moment by Gaav, who sees in him a powerful ally and a spirit of hatred towards the Golden Dragons for their betrayal. Gaav bestows upon him the powers of a monster and renames him "Valgaav".

Valgaav and Gaav are separated when the other four Demon Lords create the barrier separating the outer and inner worlds. The barrier remains in effect until Hellmaster Fibrizo's death at the end of Slayers NEXT. Valgaav is loyal only to his savior, Gaav, and gives no allegiance to any side, be it Slayers, dragons, gods, or monsters. With the combined power of a monster and Ancient Dragon, Valgaav is the strongest of Gaav's servants. However, he is notably weaker than Gaav. His Ancient Dragon power conflicts with the monster power given to him by Gaav, causing him pain. He is able to best Xellos in a one-on-one fight by using Ragud Mezagis, one of the five Darkstar weapons. He survives a magically amplified Dragon Slave fired directly into his body.

Despite his prowess as a warrior, Valgaav is radically unstable and reckless. He activates the gateway created to summon Darkstar with only two of the five weapons required. Although the gateway is closed by other gods from the Overworld, Darkstar fires a blast through it that destroys Valgaav. He reappears at the end of the season merged with the fusion of Darkstar and Volphied, and acts as an arbiter of the two. Possessing the powers of both dragon gods and monster lords, he is easily the most powerful being faced in the entire storyline of Slayers, although his power is cut in half by the open gateway. Valgaav/Darkstar/Volphied is destroyed by the combination of dark and light powers of Xellos's and Filia's abilities, combined with the five Darkstar weapons and Lina's incantation of Chaos power. At the end of Slayers TRY, he is reborn as an egg and falls under the care of Filia and two of his former demi-human subordinates, Jillas and Gravos.

Other characters

Zolf

 is a sorcerer loyal to Zelgadis in the first novel. While under the command of Zelgadis and Rezo, Zolf infiltrated a group of bandits in order to steal a statue containing the philosopher's stone. But he was injured when Lina robbed the gang and, with bandages covering his entire body, she refers to him as a "mummy" as he pursues her leading a group of trolls. After Zelgadis' break with Rezo, Zolf chooses to follow Zelgadis and remain under his command, also removing his bandages. He casts a Dragon Slave at Ruby-Eye Shabranigdu, but it is reflected back, killing Zolf and his comrade .

Dilgear

 is a half-wolf, half-troll henchman of Rezo in the first novel; referred to by Lina as a "werewolf" for lack of a more accurate term. He has a lupine face and humanoid body, and fights with a large scimitar. Although Dilgear was placed under Zelgadis' command, when Zelgadis defects and frees Lina, Dilgear attacks them both with a large group of trolls. He ends up retreating, but attacks again the following day with a larger and more varied group, including the demon sorcerer Zolom, the latter of whom is defeated by the arriving Gourry. When Zolf and Rodimus also arrive, Dilgear thinks that he has been saved, but their loyalty is to Zelgadis, not Rezo, and the werewolf is quickly defeated by Rodimus. Two months later, after Copy Rezo places bounties on Lina and Gourry in the third novel, Dilgear is revealed to have survived and attacks the two under the command of Vrumugun, but is quickly defeated by Lina's Fireball.

In the anime, Dilgear is seriously wounded by Zolf but is revived by his half-troll regenerative abilities. However, instead of seeking revenge he ends up as Luna Inverse's pet "Spot". The exact circumstances of this radical change in Dilgear's life are unknown. In the manga, Dilgear is a bounty hunter sent by Eris, along with Rahannim and Vrumugun, to eliminate Gourry and Lina.

Lantz
 is a bastard sword-wielding mercenary working for Talim the Purple in Atlas City during the second novel. He is lecherous and has red hair. Although a first-rate swordsman, he is not on the level of Gourry, whom he greatly respects after seeing his skills. When he sees the cursed mass that Daymia was turned into and learns that they are fighting demons, Lantz flees back to Talim's house where he is seriously injured by his former colleague , who has switched allegiance to Halciform simply so that he can duel Gourry. Lantz' life is saved thanks to Lina performing healing magic on him. About a month later, Lantz, now with a beard, joins Lina and Gourry in their fight against the clone of Rezo the Red Priest in the third novel. Not being able to fight demons as effectively as his comrades, Sylphiel gives him the Bless Blade, which purifies and amplifies his will, allowing him to damage demons. Lantz successfully uses it to defeat the demon Vizea.

Talim the Purple and Daymia the Blue
They have been competing for the position of chairmen since Halciform's disappearance. Talim is a fat bald man who loves eating and smoking cigars. Talim hires Lina and Gourry to work as bodyguards alongside Lantz and Rod and protect him until the election. Daymia is the balding and bearded son of a noble family, and is considered crazy by both Talim and Halciform. According to Talim, Daymia claims to be researching immortality by experimenting with homunculi and chimera, which Lina and Gourry end up fighting. But unknown to Lina and Gourry, Talim had learned that Halciform was kidnapping and experimenting on townspeople to obtain immortality. Because Halciform had obtained quasi-immortality by making a contract with Seigram, Talim recruited Daymia, who previously aided Halciform in his research until they had a falling out, to seal him away. When unwittingly freed by Lina and Gourry, Halciform has Seigram curse Daymia into an immortal mass of flesh and decapitates Talim, whose head he keeps alive in a tank until killing him as collateral damage in an attack on Lina.

Phil Saillune

 is the crown prince of the Holy Kingdom of Saillune and father of Amelia. He first appears in the fourth novel. Phil is the eldest son of King Eldran Saillune, older brother of Christopher Wil Brogg Saillune, and uncle of Alfred. With their father old and bedridden, Chris attempts to become king by ordering assassination attempts on Phil, who is first in the line of succession. With help from Lina and Gourry, it is revealed that, while Chris went along with the plan, it is his son Alfred who is chiefly behind the assassinations. After being captured by Amelia, Alfred is killed by Chris when he attempts to attack Phil.

Before the events of Slayers, Lina had helped Phil when he was the target of other assassination attempts. The culprit was Randionne, Phil and Chris' younger brother, who was killed in the incident by someone other than Lina. Also before the series, Phil's eldest daugther, Gracia Ul Naga Saillune, set out on a sojourn after his wife was killed, and now calls herself "Naga the White Serpent". Possibly due to his wife's death and Gracia's absence, Phil is very close with and protective of his youngest daughter Amelia. Like Amelia, her father has a strong belief in justice, and he is also a pacifist. However, if Phil sees something he believes to be unjust, he will not hesitate to use force. Unlike most of the Saillune royal family, Phil has no magical powers, but his brute strength is sufficient to destroy lesser demons.

Zellas Metallium
 is one of the five demon lieutenants created by Shabranigdu. Xellos serves as her right-hand man, and everything Xellos does in the end leads back to her. Whereas Shabranigdu's four other demon lieutenants created both a priest and general to do their bidding, Zellas only created Xellos, thus he is twice as strong as the other demon emissaries. During the Incarnation War, Shabranigdu posted Zellas to Wolfpack Isle as part of the seal to destroy Aqualord.

Milgazia

 is the elder golden dragon at Dragons' Peak, a settlement of golden and black dragons who protect a door to the Claire Bible. First appearing in the seventh novel, he is over 1,000 years old and previously met Xellos as an enemy during the Incarnation War. After taking on a human form, he guides Lina to the Claire Bible, out of fear of Xellos, where she learns the truth behind the Giga Slave spell. Milgazia saves Lina when Raltark appears, and later heals Amelia when she is seriously injured. Milgazia and his elven companion Mephis join Lina in her travels for a while.

Zangulus

 is an anime-only character. He is a mercenary and swordsman of considerable skill. Although he cannot use magic, he wields a weapon called the Howling Sword, a magical sword created by Rezo that can shoot great gusts of wind. Zangulus and the sorcerer Vrumugun were originally hired as bounty hunters by Eris and Copy Rezo to capture Lina, Gourry, and Zelgadis and bring them to Sairaag.

Zangulus becomes obsessed with fighting Gourry to see who is the better swordsman. They duel in Rezo's lab, but Gourry wins in the end, and Zangulus leaves. He reappears towards the end of Slayers NEXT, looking for a rematch. However, Gourry is being held prisoner by Hellmaster Fibrizo, so Zangulus does not get a chance to duel him a second time. He does help Lina and the others fight the Hellmaster. It is during this time that Zangulus meets and falls in love with Martina, who he marries after the battle.

Jillas

 is a red fox beastman and a servant of Valgaav. Jillas' people were nearly hunted to extinction. After being injured by humans and losing his left eye, Jillas is saved by Valgaav. He is partnered with Gravos Maunttop, who he refers to as "Boss". He has no knowledge of magic or swordplay, but is skilled with guns, gunpowder and various explosives. He also has a knack for exploiting the friction between people to his advantage, and employs psychological warfare against the Slayers to great effect.

In TRY, Valgaav orders Gravos and Jillas to locate and recover the five Darkstar weapons. When Gravos loses control of Ragudo Mezegis is blasted away by a Dragon Slave, Jillas swears vengeance on the Slayers, and succeeds in stealing Gorun Nova from Gourry.

After everyone is separated and Valgaav is presumed dead, Jillas is rescued by a fox named Elena and her son Palou, who call him "uncle". He abandons them to seek vengeance when he discovers that the Slayers are still alive. Filia saves him from the explosion of one of his own bombs, after which he calls her "Boss", a name that makes her uncomfortable. After Valgaav is reborn as a pure Ancient Dragon and is adopted by Filia, Jillas and Gravos (who was literally launched into orbit by the Dragon Slave) become her partners and help her sell maces and pottery in a shop.

Gravos Maunttop

, a reptilian beastman, is a servant of Valgaav. His first appearance in the series is in Episode 54 of TRY. Gravos was almost killed by his own people, causing him to lose his right eye. Valgaav saves him and becomes his master. During TRY, Gravos and Jillas attempt to steal Gorun Nova on Valgaav's orders. During a struggle to get the holy magic and the black magic vessels from Princess Sera and Prince Marco, Gravos loses control of Ragudo Mezegis when he is hit by the Dragon Slave and is knocked into the distance, presumed dead. However, he is alive and well in the epilogue of TRY, once again partnered with Jillas and helping Filia run a store that sells maces and pottery.

Luna Inverse
, Lina's older sister, was born in a small village in Zephilia, the first daughter of merchants. Her father is an ex-mercenary and her mother is an ex-sorceress.

Luna and Lina's relationship is not particularly affectionate. Apparently, when they were younger, Lina would misbehave and Luna would "punish" her by making her do grueling workouts. The most notorious incident between the two was when Lina, ever keen on an opportunity to make some extra cash, set up a device that projected an image of Luna while she was taking a bath. Luna's reaction "compelled" Lina to begin her quest. Lina is still terrified of Luna, and even the mere mention of her sister sends Lina into a panic attack, as seen in “Slayers Try episode 2” and Slayers Revolution episode 8.

A fragment of Ceifeed's will is lodged within Luna. In Slayers TRY, when the Slayers visit the Fire Dragon Temple, it is mentioned that she is known as the "Ceifeed Knight". As the Knight of Ceifeed, Luna wields an immense amount of holy power. Luna never appears in person during the novels or the anime, but Hajime Kanzaka has said that she is slightly more powerful than Xellos. She can cut a Dragon Slave in half with an ordinary, non-magical sword, and once defeated a plasma dragon with a kitchen knife.

In Slayers TRY, Luna is Filia's first choice to save the world from the prophecy of destruction. Luna, being on the side of the gods, knows she is not the candidate in the prophecy; she turns down Filia's request and suggests Lina for the job instead.

Deities

Shabranigdu

, also known as the Dark Lord, is a powerful being of evil, the ruler and strongest of the demons. He is said to be the sole source of misery and negative emotions in the Slayers world. Defeated long ago by Flare Dragon Ceifeed, Shabranigdu was split into seven parts and scattered throughout the world. Over a thousand years before the series begins, one of these parts awakened in the Kataart Mountains within the legendary sorcerer Lei Magnus, the Demon King of the North. When the piece of Shabranigdu within him awakened, he led the demons against the dragons. He was defeated and sealed in ice by Aqualord, an avatar of Ceifeed. However, Aqualord was destroyed, leaving only her memories and knowledge, which became the Claire Bible. The remaining four Demon Lords (Dynast Grausherra, Deep Sea Dolphin, Beastmaster Zelas Metallium, and Hellmaster Phibrizzo) erected a shield that sealed the divine powers in the outer world, separated from the inner world where the Slayers takes place.

A second portion of Shabranigdu awakens in the first novel. Rezo the Red Priest awakens the fragment sealed within his eyes when he uses the philosopher's stone in an attempt to cure his blindness. Lina confronts the unbound piece of Shabranigdu, invoking the Giga Slave to defeat him. It is possible that Shabranigdu could have survived this attack, but a fragment of Rezo's remaining will forces open its defenses.

In the final Slayers novel, a third fragment of Shabranigdu is buried in the soul of a character named Luke, who had previously appeared as a rival. Driven to despair by the events of the previous book, Luke is contacted by the fragment of Ruby-Eye within him and manages to strike a deal with it: he will fight Lina and Gourry one more time, and if he is victorious, the fragment will wholly revive and complete the monster race's goal of destroying the world. As Luke ultimately wishes to die in the battle, rather than destroy the world, his self-destructive impulse allows him and the fragment to be slain by the Dragon Slave. This battle is the only known exception to the monsters' immunity to black magic drawn from their own power (described by Lina as, "Hey, help me kill you").

In the Slayers Evolution-R anime, the Red Priest revives, bringing the fragment of Shabranigdu back to life with him. It possesses the true body of Pokota, and when Pokota returns to his body, it causes instability between the occupying souls, allowing Lina's perfected Giga Slave to destroy Shabranigdu.

Lord of Nightmares
 is the demiurge of the Slayers universe, the creator of everything. Although she has no defined gender, she is generally considered female because she possessed Lina's body and took her form in her sole appearance in the series. Unlike most creator deities in fiction, the Lord of Nightmares is not considered benevolent and humans do not worship her. Even among those steeped in the magical arts, few are aware of her existence. Those of the monster race are, and refer to her as "the Mother of All Beings".

The Lord of Nightmares created the entire Slayers multiverse, including the futuristic galaxy portrayed in Lost Universe, and two other known worlds, the realms of Chaotic Blue and Death Fog. Both Shabranigdu and his rival Ceifeed are her direct creations. The Lord of Nightmares may have done this simply because she wanted to watch gods, monsters, and mortals contend for her amusement, a hypothesis adopted by Valgaav in Slayers TRY in his attempt to remake the world. Another theory is that the Lord of Nightmares requires the chaos of battle for sustenance.

Lina is the only human known to directly use the power of the Lord of Nightmares in spells, and she is reluctant to do so. Spells that call upon the power of the Lord of Nightmares are notoriously unreliable, with failure frequently having devastating consequences. The Giga Slave, for instance, could theoretically destroy existence itself if miscast. Lina created the Giga Slave when she was much younger by combining parts of the Dragon Slave's incantation with chaos words of the Lord of Nightmares that she found in a Claire Bible manuscript. When she cast the spell for the first time, she turned a body of water into a sea of death, where no living thing can grow. To call upon the power of Chaos is to call upon the Lord of Nightmares herself, and she can withhold her power if she chooses; "My mind is my power, my power is my mind," she says in the Slayers NEXT finale.

The Lord of Nightmares's only direct appearance is in Slayers NEXT, when Lina is goaded into casting the Giga Slave by Hellmaster Phibrizzo, who wants the power of Chaos to destroy the world. Before this point, the Lord of Nightmares had no physical form, having sacrificed her body to create the Sea of Chaos and the Four Worlds. Using Lina's body as a vessel, the power of Chaos obliterates Phibrizzo. She also makes good on Lina's final thoughts and wishes by reviving her companions and allowing them to see her. She declares that Lina is gone forever, consumed by her power, with Xellos explaining that when "existence calls forth oblivion, it must return to oblivion". The only thing that saves Lina's soul from the Sea of Chaos is Gourry's sacrifice of the Sword of Light.

The Lord of Nightmares does not intervene in the battle against Valgaav and Darkstar at the end of Slayers TRY, since Lina doesn't cast the Giga Slave spell. Instead, the Slayers create a power very similar to that of Chaos by combining the powers of the monsters and the gods, Light and Dark, to destroy Valgaav and Darkstar.

Ceifeed

In each world of this universe, a Dragon King and a Demon King struggle against each other to direct the fate of the world. In the Red World, in which Slayers is set, Ceifeed is the Dragon King who battles the Demon King Ruby-Eye Shabranigdu. Ceifeed successfully weakened his demonic counterpart by cutting Shabranigdu into seven pieces. Ceifeed dies in the process, but leaves behind four beings to continue his struggle: Aqualord Ragradia, Flarelord Valbazard, Earthlord Rangort, and Airlord Valwyn. A fragment of his will is lodged in Luna Inverse, Lina's older sister, who is known as the "Ceifeed Knight".

Darkstar Dugradigdo
Darkstar Dugradigo is one of the four Demon Kings created by the Lord of Nightmares. He is the main antagonist of the Black World, and appears in the Slayers TRY anime attempting to cross over into the Red World and cause further destruction. The gods of the Black World aim to destroy him using the five weapons he created: Gorun Nova (the Sword of Light), Ragudo Mezegis, Nezzard, Bodigar, and Galvayra.

In his own world, Darkstar is the equivalent of Shabranigdu in power, as Volphied is the equivalent of Ceifeed. Darkstar devours Volphied, but grows so powerful that he can't control his own power, and becomes a being seeking only the destruction of everything. However, Valgaav reveals that Darkstar "devoured" Volphied by mutual agreement between the two. They realized how meaningless the eternal fight between gods and monsters was, and fused to bring "purification" to the worlds by destroying and remaking them so that gods and monsters would not have to constantly fight.

Half monster and half god, the new Darkstar merges with Valgaav, who is the same combination. Darkstar's "astral body" is different from those of any other monster, making magic useless against him. Darkstar can only be defeated by the five weapons he created. When Filia and Xellos combine the powers of Light and Dark, of Ceifeed and Shabranigdu, and unleash it through the five weapons of Darkstar, the resulting Chaos force vanquishes him for good.

References

Slayers